Alue Dohong is an Indonesian politician and incumbent Deputy Minister of Environment and Forestry. He was appointed on 25 October 2019. Before appointed, he was a lecturer in University of Palangka Raya. Other than that, he also worked on Peat Land Restoration Agency. He is of ethnic Dayak origin. Born in East Kotawaringin Regency, he got bachelor on economy in University of Palangka Raya and continuing to University of Nottingham to get Master of Science and doctor in University of Queensland.

Indonesian capital city relocation 
In May 2021, together with several cultural and tribal organizations of Dayak, he organized recording and inventorization of traditional lands of Dayak people in area for new capital of Indonesia in East Kalimantan to minimize future land conflict and save ownership of tribal lands for its tribal owners.

References 

1966 births
Living people
People from East Kotawaringin Regency
Dayak people
Indonesian politicians
University of Palangka Raya alumni
Alumni of the University of Nottingham
University of Queensland alumni